Brit Solli (born 1959) is a Norwegian archaeologist and Professor of Medieval archaeology at the Museum of Cultural History in Oslo. Until 2005, she was Professor in Historic Archaeology at the University of Tromsø.

From August 2012, Solli has been appointed to be Scientific Director at the Centre for Advanced Study (CAS), at The Norwegian Academy of Science and Letters in Oslo, for a period of three years.

Research and academic achievements 
Solli's areas of research span a wide array of themes, including Archaeological research history, theory and method, archaeology and identity, archaeology of gender, archaeology and zoo-archaeology, cultural heritage management and archaeology of Old Norse religion. Solli has also carried out research on Christianisation of the Norse, urbanization, and socio-political history of the Viking Age and Middle Ages.

In addition to this, Solli has participated in numerous excavations, and has led the Veøya-project and the Borg III-project. She is currently involved in an interdisciplinary project which is supported by the Norwegian Research Council. The project, called Snow Patch Archaeological Research Cooperation, or SPARC, concerns archaeology and climate change.

Solli was on the editorial board of Journal of the North Atlantic until 2011, and is currently on the editorial board of Current Swedish Archaeology. She was also one of the editors of Norwegian Archaeological Review until 2009.
For the period of 2010 - 2011, Solli was Editor-in-Chief of the Norwegian archaeological journal VIKING.

In 1992, Solli was awarded a cultural prize for disseminating archaeology to the general public. The prize was awarded her in relation to the Veøya-project.

References

External links 
 Publications by Brit Solli in BIBSYS
 Publications by Brit Solli in the research documentation system Cristin
 About Brit Solli at the University of Oslo
 The SPARC project at Forskningsradet.no

1959 births
Living people
Archaeologists from Oslo
Norwegian women archaeologists